Bomberman Land is a video game released on December 21, 2000, for PlayStation as part of the Bomberman franchise. 

It is the first installment of the Bomberman Land series and would spawn its own series of sequels; including Bomberman Land 2, 2005's Bomberman Land 3, Bomberman Land Touch!, Bomberman Land Touch! 2, and the 2007 Wii and PSP games.

Background
Bomberman Land is a game that allows a multiplayer experience that allows the players to adventure through a series of mini games. It also gives the option of playing single player in Story Mode. There are various levels, puzzles, and quests to be solved. The game also includes Battle Pack Mode, which is the classic way of playing Bomberman.

The goal of the game is to collect 125 B-CARD pieces obtained through the adventures inside the Bomberman Land theme park.

Story
The story begins with the White Bomber at the beach for leisure, and he receives an invitation to an amusement park. When he arrives, he realizes that the other characters and friends from the game also got invites and were there as well. A strange figure appears on the screen and steals the main Director away. It is now the White Bomber's job to win the various events and defeat the Champion at his own game.

References

External links
Bomberman Land at Hudson Soft (Japanese) on Wayback Machine
Bomberman Land - Hudson Game Navi at Hudson Soft (Japanese) on Wayback Machine

2000 video games
Konami franchises
Land
Japan-exclusive video games
PlayStation (console) games
PlayStation Network games
Multiplayer and single-player video games
Video games developed in Japan
Video games set in amusement parks

Hudson Soft games
Party video games